Moonee Ponds is an inner-city suburb in Melbourne, Victoria, Australia,  north-west of Melbourne's Central Business District, located within the City of Moonee Valley local government area. Moonee Ponds recorded a population of 16,224 at the 2021 census.

Moonee Ponds is home to Queens Park and the Moonee Valley Racecourse.

Demographics

In Moonee Ponds 69.9% of people were born in Australia. The other most common countries of birth were Italy 5.4%, India 2.6%, England 2.3%, Greece 1.5%, and New Zealand 1.5%.

70.9% of people only spoke English at home. Other languages spoken at home included Italian 8.8%, Greek 3.6%, Cantonese 1.0%, Spanish 0.9% and Mandarin 0.9%.

Sport

Essendon Royals Soccer Club is located in Moonee Ponds and plays in the Victorian State League.

The suburb has an Australian rules football team, Maribyrnong Park playing in the Essendon District Football League, and another, Moonee Valley Football Club, based at Ormond Park competing in the same league. Moonee Valley Cricket Club also located at Ormond Park competes in the VTCA.

Transport

Moonee Ponds station is located at the western end of Puckle Street, on the Craigieburn railway line. Bus route 467 runs from the station to Aberfeldie. For details of other tram/bus routes see Moonee Ponds Junction which is located at the eastern end of Puckle Street.

The Maribyrnong River Trail and Moonee Ponds Creek Trail are cycling tracks in and around Moonee Ponds.

Attractions

The Clocktower Centre was originally constructed as the Essendon Mechanics' Institute, which was later purchased by the State of Victoria to become the Essendon Town Hall. Today it is primarily used as a large theatre. As well as serving for some international, interstate and local functions, the centre has a number of conference rooms. It is named after its prominent clock tower.

Moonee Ponds Junction is the centre of the suburb, with buses, trams and trains all converging in the area. The Clocktower Centre is nearby.

Puckle Street is the main shopping street and there are many shops and cafes along its length. At its eastern end is Moonee Ponds Junction and at its western end is Moonee Ponds train station.

The Moonee Valley Racecourse is one of Melbourne's four horse racing tracks.

Moonee Ponds Central Shopping Centre has many stores including Kmart, Aldi, The Coffee Club, Man to Man, EB Games, Smiggle and Moonee Ponds Sewing.

Moonee Ponds is also home to many restaurants. Most notable among these are Jack's Satay Bar, Carosello, Philhellene, Darling St Espresso and Khao San Road, plus KFC – a traditional first date location for youth in the area.

There is a range of allied health professions in the Moonee Ponds area, including acupuncture and Chinese medicine at Qi Medicine Acupuncture Melbourne, physiotherapy at Platform 7 Physiotherapy, optometry at Specsavers Moonee Ponds and osteopathy at Beyond Fitness Health.

Notable residents

Moonee Ponds is the location of the office and private home of politician and former Australian Opposition Leader Bill Shorten. Australian singer Tina Arena and photographer Ruth Hollick grew up in the area.

An incomplete list of its other residents includes:

 Shaun Atley, North Melbourne Footballer and part-time DJ.

 Allen Aylett, former North Melbourne Football Club player and chairman/president
 Aydan Calafiore, The Voice and Eurovision: Aus Decides 2019 contestant and singer
 E. Morris Miller, philosopher and vice-chancellor, earlier a member of the Moonee Ponds Mental Improvement Society
 Jason Moran, Melbourne underworld figure
 Jake Webster, former Melbourne Storm player who now plays for Hull Kingston Rovers in the Super League
 Lilian Wells, only woman president of Congregational Union of Australia, and first moderator of the NSW Synod, Uniting Church in Australia. She was born in Moonee Ponds.

The fictitious character of Dame Edna Everage also claimed to be from Moonee Ponds. There is a street in the suburb named Everage Street in her honour.

See also
 City of Essendon – Moonee Ponds was previously within this former local government area.

References

Suburbs of Melbourne
Suburbs of the City of Moonee Valley
Essendon, Victoria